Mystery Skulls is the first EP by American indie pop/electronica band Mystery Skulls. It was produced by Luis Dubuc, the lead singer/songwriter of the group. It was released on December 28, 2011.

Critical reception
Groove loves melody gave a positive review of the album: "Mystery Skulls, is bringing an infectious synth/dance EP. The sound is a slightly funkier Scissor Sisters with a hat tip to the musicality of San Serac and remembering Prince's falsetto." Sputnik Music said,

Track listing

Charts

References

External links
Mystery Skulls on Bandcamp

 Concert review: Homegrown Music and Art Festival at DFW.com

2011 debut EPs